The Women's 100m freestyle event at the 2010 South American Games was held on March 27, with the heats at 11:01 and the Final at 18:20.

Medalists

Records

Results

Heats

Final

References
Heats
Final

Freestyle 100m W